The 1910 college football season had no clear-cut champion, with the Official NCAA Division I Football Records Book listing Harvard and Pittsburgh as having been retrospectively selected national champions, by four "major selectors" in about 1927, 1947, 1970 and 1980. Only Harvard claims a national championship for the 1910 season.

Rules
Rule changes were made prior to the 1910 season to permit more use of the forward pass, with complicated limitations:
The only eligible receivers were the two ends, who could catch a pass no more than 20 yards beyond the line of scrimmage, and could not be interfered with until the ball was caught.
A legal pass could not be thrown unless the quarterback was at least 5 yards behind the line of scrimmage and the rest of the players, except the two ends, were at least 1 yard behind the scrimmage line.
On kickoffs and punts, the kicking team's players could not be touched until they had advanced 20 yards
Flying tackles were outlawed, and "the man making a tackle must have at least one foot on the ground".
The ballcarrier could no longer be aided in any way by his teammates.

Other rules in 1910 were:
Field 110 yards in length
Kickoff made from midfield
Three downs to gain ten yards
Touchdown worth 5 points
Field goal worth 3 points
Game time based on agreement of the teams, not to exceed two 45 minute halves.

The season ran from September 24 until Thanksgiving Day (November 24). Prior to Thanksgiving, the season's death toll was 22; the previous season's was thirty.

Conference and program changes
 The Colorado Faculty Athletic Conference (CFAC) changed its name to the Rocky Mountain Faculty Athletic Conference (RMFAC, now just the Rocky Mountain Athletic Conference)  in 1910 after expanding into Utah.

Conference changes

Program changes
Arkansas changed its nickname from the Cardinals to the current Razorbacks.

Conference standings

Major conference standings

Independents

Minor conferences

Minor conference standings

Awards and honors

All-Americans

The consensus All-America team included Walter Camp's selections:

References